Saint-Diéry is a commune in the Puy-de-Dôme department in Auvergne in central France. On 1 January 2019, the former commune Creste was merged into Saint-Diéry.

See also
Communes of the Puy-de-Dôme department

References

Saintdiery